Keitele is a municipality of Finland.

It is part of the Northern Savonia region.

Neighbour municipalities are Pielavesi, Pihtipudas, Tervo, Vesanto and Viitasaari.

Despite its name, the municipality is not located by the lake Keitele. The shortest distance between the municipality and the lake is roughly ten kilometers. 

The municipality is unilingually Finnish.

Notable people born in Keitele
Ilmari Tossavainen (1887–1978)
Kalle Matilainen (1903–1973)
Rakel Hiltunen (1940–)
Mikko Härkin (1979–)

References

External links

Municipality of Keitele – Official website

 
Populated places established in 1879